J.E. King Manufacturing Company, also known as the Long-King Furniture, Cloud Furniture Manufacturing, and Springfield Seed Company, is a historic daylight factory building located at Springfield, Greene County, Missouri. It was built in 1922, and expanded in the 1930s and 1940s.  It is a two-story, "L"-shaped red brick building with a Streamline Moderne Style-influenced glass block storefront at first floor level.  Also on the property is a contributing building that housed electrical transformers.

It was listed on the National Register of Historic Places in 2005.

References

Industrial buildings and structures on the National Register of Historic Places in Missouri
Industrial buildings completed in 1922
Buildings and structures in Springfield, Missouri
National Register of Historic Places in Greene County, Missouri
Furniture manufacturers
Defunct manufacturing companies based in Missouri